Elvin Barr (5 November 1908 – 14 April 1985) was  a former Australian rules footballer who played with Collingwood in the Victorian Football League (VFL).

Notes

External links 

		
Elvin Barr's profile at Collingwood Forever

1908 births
1985 deaths
Australian rules footballers from Victoria (Australia)
Collingwood Football Club players